To Catch a Killer is an upcoming American thriller film directed by Damián Szifron, from a screenplay by Szifron and Jonathan Wakeham. It stars Shailene Woodley, Ben Mendelsohn and Jovan Adepo. The film marks Argentine filmmaker Damián Szifron's English-language debut.

It is scheduled to be released on April 21, 2023, by Vertical Entertainment.

Premise 
The film will center on a talented but troubled cop (Woodley) who is recruited by the FBI to help profile and track down a murderer.

Cast 
 Shailene Woodley as Eleanor, a talented but troubled cop recruited by the FBI to track down a serial killer
 Ben Mendelsohn as Chief Investigator Geoffrey Lammark
 Jovan Adepo as Mackenzie, an FBI agent
 Ralph Ineson as Dean Possey, a trained sharpshooter and serial killer

Production
In May 2019, Shailene Woodley joined the cast of the film, with Damián Szifron directing from a screenplay he co-wrote alongside Jonathan Wakeham. Woodley will also serve as a producer on the film. In October 2019, it was announced Mark Strong was in talks to join the cast of the film. In December 2020, Ben Mendelsohn joined the cast of the film. In January 2021, Jovan Adepo joined the cast of the film. Ralph Ineson was revealed as part of the cast in March 2021.

Principal photography began in January 2021 in Montreal, Canada, and concluded on March 10, 2021.

References

External links 
 

Upcoming films
American drama films
American thriller films
American serial killer films
FilmNation Entertainment films